Say Something Nice to Sarah is an album by American country singer Ernest Tubb, released in 1972 (see 1972 in music).

Track listing
"Honky Tonks and You" (Billy Hughes)
"It's Four in the Morning" (Jerry Chesnut)
"Ninety-Nine Years" (Glen Johnson)
"Heartaches by the Number" (Harlan Howard)
"I Care No More" (Jesse Ashlock)
"Pearlie Mai's Place" (Jim Anglin)
"Good Hearted Woman" (Waylon Jennings, Willie Nelson)
"Say Something Nice to Sarah" (John R. Cash, Winafred Rushing Kelley)
"I've Been Walkin'" (Gladys Flatt, E. Graves)
"Teach My Daddy How to Pray" (Jim Baker, Jim Owen)
"Look Twice Before You Go" (Jimmie Skinner)

Personnel
Ray Edenton - guitar
Jack Mollette - guitar
Joe Pruneda - bass
Harold Bradley - bass guitar
Billy Pfender - drums
Leon Boulanger - fiddle
Hargus "Pig" Robbins - piano
Buddy Charleston  - steel guitar
Sonny Lomas - drums (track 11)

Chart positions

References

Ernest Tubb albums
1972 albums